Krasnokamenka may refer to:
Krasnokamenka, Kazakhstan, a place in Kazakhstan
Krasnokamenka, Russia, several inhabited localities in Russia
Krasnokamianka (urban-type settlement) (Krasnokamenka), an urban-type settlement in Crimea
Krasnokamianka (village) (Krasnokamenka), a village in Crimea

See also
Kamenka (disambiguation)